Grain drying is process of drying grain to prevent spoilage during storage. The grain drying described in this article is that which uses fuel- or electric-powered processes supplementary to natural ones, including swathing/windrowing for drying by ambient air and sunshine, or stooking before threshing.

Overview 

Hundreds of millions of tonnes of wheat, corn, soybean, rice and other grains as sorghum, sunflower seeds, rapeseed/canola, barley, oats, etc., are dried in grain dryers. In the main agricultural countries, drying comprises the reduction of moisture from about 17-30% w/w to values between 8 and 15%w/w, depending on the grain. The final moisture content for drying must be adequate for storage. The more oil the grain has, the lower its storage moisture content will be (though its initial moisture for drying will also be lower). Cereals are often dried to 14% w/w, while oilseeds, to 12.5% (soybeans), 8% (sunflower) and 9% (peanuts). Drying is carried out as a requisite for safe storage, in order to inhibit microbial growth. However, low temperatures in storage are also highly recommended to avoid degradative reactions and, especially, the growth of insects and mites. A good maximum storage temperature is about 18 °C.

The largest dryers are normally used "Off-farm", in elevators, and are of the continuous type: Mixed-flow dryers are preferred in Europe, while Cross-flow dryers in the United States. In Argentina, both types are commonly found. Continuous flow dryers may produce up to 100 metric tonnes of dried grain per hour. The depth of grain the air must traverse in continuous dryers range from some 0.15 m in Mixed flow dryers to some 0.30 m in Cross-Flow. Batch dryers are mainly used "On-Farm", particularly in the United States and Europe. They normally consist of a bin, with heated air flowing horizontally from an internal cylinder through an inner perforated metal sheet, then through an annular grain bed, some 0.50 m thick (coaxial with the internal cylinder) in radial direction, and finally across the outer perforated metal sheet, before being discharged to the atmosphere. The usual drying times range from 1 h to 4 h depending on how much water must be removed, type of grain, air temperature and the grain depth. In the United States, continuous counterflow dryers may be found on-farm, adapting a bin to slowly drying grain fed at the top and removed at the bottom of the bin by a sweeping auger.

Grain drying is an active area of research. The performance of a dryer can be simulated with computer programs based on mathematical models that represent the phenomena involved in drying: physics, physical chemistry, thermodynamics, and heat and mass transfer. Most recently computer models have been used to predict product quality by achieving a compromise between drying rate, energy consumption, and grain quality. A typical quality parameter in wheat drying is breadmaking quality and germination percentage whose reductions in drying are somewhat related.

Grain Drying fundamentals 
Drying starts at the bottom of the bin, which is the first place air contacts. The dry air is brought up by the fan through a layer of wet grain. Drying happens in a layer of 1 to 2 feet thick, which is called the drying zone. The drying zone moves from the bottom of the bin to the top, and when it reaches the highest layer, the grain is dry. The grain below drying zone is in equilibrium moisture content with drying air, which means it is safe for storage; while the grain above still needs drying. The air is then forced out the bin through exhaust vent.

Allowable Storage Time 
Allowable storage time is an estimate of how long the grain needs to be dried before spoilage and maintain grain quality during storage. In grain storage process, fungi or molds are the primary concern. Many other factors, such as insects, rodents, and bacteria, also affect the condition of storage. The lower the grain temperature is, the longer the allowable storage time will be.

Proper moisture levels for safe storage 
It is possible for long period safe storage if grain moisture content is less than 14%, and stored away from insects, rodents and birds. The following figure is the recommended moisture content for safe storage.

Equilibrium Moisture Content 
Moisture content in grain is related to the relative humidity and the temperature of the surrounding air. Equilibrium moisture content point is the point when grain no longer losing or gaining water when contacting with drying air. The final moisture content of the grain is up to the amount of moisture in the drying air, which is the relative humidity. The low relative humidity means air is dry and it has a large potential of picking up water. The lower the relative humidity is, the drier the air is. In general, one-half reduce in relative humidity is caused by 20° degree increase in air temperature.

Temperature 
Heated air may be used in grain drying process. It can not only accelerate moisture migration inside the kernel, but also can evaporate the moisture on the surface. The major problem about heated air for drying process is the kernel temperature. The grain kernel may be damaged by high kernel temperatures. Usually, kernel temperature is lower than the air temperature.
For different use of the corn, temperatures vary. For example, for seed corn, the maximum temperature is 110 °F; for livestock feeding corn, the maximum temperature is 180 °F.

Aeration 
Aeration process refers to the process of moving air through grain. Airflow is a measurement of the amount of air in cubic feet per minute (CFM). In grain drying process, drying time is largely depended on aeration rates. Without sufficient airflow, grain may be damaged before drying is complete. Fans are used to move air through grain.

Drying cost 
The drying cost is made up of two parts: the capital cost and the operating cost. Capital cost is largely depend on the drying rate requirement, and equipment cost. Operating cost refers to fuel, electricity and labor force cost. The amount of energy required to dry a bushel of grain is similar for all the drying methods. Some methods depend largely on natural air, while others may use LP heat or natural gas, which make energy cost vary. Basically, fuel and electrical power are the major portions of the operating cost.  Drying cost is based on the B.T.U. consumption of temperature change from environment to desired one.

Classification of grain drying methods according to mode of heat transfer 

In-storage drying methods
  Low-temperature drying
  Multiple-layer drying

Batch drying methods
 Bin batch drying
  Column batch drying

Continuous flow drying methods
 Cross flow drying
 Counter flow drying
 Concurrent flow drying

In-storage drying methods

Low-temperature Drying 
In-storage drying methods refers to those grain is dried and stored in the same container. Low-temperature drying, also known as near-ambient drying, is one of in-storage drying methods. There are four major factors which influence low temperature drying: the variability of weather, the harvest moisture content, the air flow in the storage bin and the amount of heated air. Most low-temperature dryers are built to dry grain as slowly as possible, while in the same time less spoilage on the grain. It is suggested that low temperature drying system is better operated when the average daily temperature is between 30 °C and 50 °C. Rather than control the drying air temperature, the low-temperature drying focuses on the relative humidity in order to achieve equilibrium moisture content (EMC) in all grain layers. Low-temperature drying process usually takes 5 days to several months depends on several important variables: weather, airflow, initial moisture content and amount of heat used. Among which, airflow is the key factor. Without appropriate airflow rate, spoilage will occur before drying is completed. By using heated air (LP heat, electric heat and solar heat), the relative humidity of the drying air is better controlled to achieve the desired moisture content. Usually, heated air dryer is used when the relative humidity larger than 70%. In electric heat dryers, an electrical resistant heater is usually placed before the fan to heat the airstream. In some case, a humidistat is employed to control the heater. In solar heat dryers, the drying air passes through the solar collector first to be heated (usually 10 to 12 °F rise), then enters the bin through the fan and motor. The advantages of in-storage low temperature drying are quick filling, high quality product, less equipment requirement; while the disadvantages are long drying time, electrical demand if using electric heat, high management skills and uncertain harvest moisture content.

Multiple-layer Drying 
Multiple layer drying method refers to the use of LP heat or natural gas in drying corn. Compared to low-temperature methods, multiple-layer drying requires higher temperatures, which results in a shorter allowable storage time.
Multiple-layer drying without stirring is the basic multiple-layer drying method, in which airstream is entered through an LP heater by a fan. Usually, the temperature rise after the LP burner is remained low in order to avoid over drying in the bottom layers in the bin.  As soon as corn is dried in the bin, the burner is turned off and the fan is used to bring the corn to ambient temperature. The advantages of multiple-layer drying without stirring are little handling of corn, and bin can be used as either dryer or storage; the disadvantages are slow filling and over drying in the bottom layers (Bern and Brumm, 2010).
Multiple-layer drying with stirring can not only dry grain equilibrium from top to bottom, but also decrease the air resistance of the grain. Moreover, using stirring system can avoid over drying in bottom layer problem and give a uniform grain moisture content in the whole bin. When drying is complete, the burner is turned off while the fan and stirrer are used to mix the corn to achieve equal moisture content and temperature. The advantages of adding stirring are preventing over drying and accelerating drying and allowable fill rate; the disadvantages of stirring system are additional expenses and decreasing bin capacity.

Batch drying methods

Bin-Batch Drying 
In batch drying methods, certain amount of grain is placed first, usually 2 to 4 inches, the batch is dried and cooled later, then drying is stopped and batch is removed. The batch dryers are usually operating under this sequence and repeating this sequence for several times. The bin-batch drying methods employ a full perforated floor as the dryer. Without stirring, large variety of equipment is available and the batch can be used as both dryer and cooler, but there may be large moisture gradient from top to bottom and losing time in loading and unloading process. When adding stirring system, unequilibrium moisture content problem is avoided, however, stirrer is an added expense. When using bin-batch roof dryer, time losing problem can be solved. There is a drying floor under the bin roof and the drying fan and burner is installed high on the bin wall. When the drying process is completed, grain is put in the regular bin floor, thus unloading time is reduced. However, there is no wet grain holding in bin-batch roof dryers and there is more expense on machines.

Column Batch Drying 
The column formed in this kind of dryer is made up of two vertical perforated steel sheets, which is about 12 inches thick each. The capacity of column batch dryers is too small to store grains. The advantages of column batch, stationary bed dryer are easy to move and the dyer can be used as cooler; while the disadvantages are time losing when cooling, loading and unloading and unequal moisture distribution when drying is completed. When column batch recirculating dryer is used, the moisture content variation problem is avoided, but the additional handling process may result in grain spoilage.

Continuous flow drying methods

Cross Flow Drying 
Cross flow dryers is one of the most widely used continuous flow dryers. In the cross flow dryer, the airstream is perpendicular to the grain flow. Then the grain near the drying air is over dried, while on the other side, grain is under dried. Moisture gradient exists when drying is complete.  In reality, the lower the airflow rate, the higher the grain moisture content variation between two sides of the column.

Concurrent Flow Drying 
In the concurrent flow dryer, both the grain and air are moving in the same direction, which means the wettest grain is subjected to the hottest drying air. The kernels leave the drying region at the same temperature and the same moisture content. Energy efficiency is 40% better compared to cross flow dryer. However, the bed depth must be deeper than 12 inches depth than cross flow type. Thus, fan power requirements are high in this type of dryer.

Counter Flow Drying 
In the counter flow dryer, the grain and the air are moving in opposite directions, which mean the driest grain is subjected to the hottest drying air. The kernels leave the drying region at the same temperature and the same moisture as in concurrent flow dryers. The suggesting air temperatures are less than 180 °F because the driest kernels are more likely to be damaged by hot air.

Drying of specific crops

Sunflower drying 
For different types of sunflowers, the preservation moisture content is different. Oilseed sunflowers are better dried to 9 percent moisture content, while bird seed sunflowers are 10 percent moisture content. Compared to corn drying, sunflowers are more easily dried and kept in safe storage. What's more, high temperature may not have adverse effect on sunflowers kernel, which may be the reason of the fatty acid composition. There was no evidence of damage when air was heated up to 220 °F in drying. However, fine hairs and fibers on the seed coat of sunflowers may cause fire hazard. It is suggested that remove the flaming particles first when heating the sunflowers.

Bean drying 
The seed coat of bean is quite fragile and easy to damaged in cracking and splitting, which may cause loss to the producer. Some studies on beans suggested that in order to avoid cracking, it is better to keep drying air above 40 percent relative humidity.

Corn drying 
When drying corn kernels it is important to keep in mind that cracks and fractures in the corn can lead to many problems in both the storage and processing. The major problem that occurs from high temperature drying and then rapid cooling of the grain is stress-cracking. Stress-cracking is when fractures become present in the corn endosperm. Stress-cracked kernels often absorb water too quickly, are more likely to become broken, and are increasingly susceptible to insect and mold damage during dry storage. In order to reduce the amount of grain that is lost due to stress-cracking, medium temperature and slow cooling, or natural air and low temperature drying methods should be employed.

History

The era in which millions of tons of grain are dried by fuel-powered or electric-powered dryers at industrial scale as a routine matter of course did not begin until the postwar era after World War II. Its advent was necessary for the advent of ubiquitous combine harvesting in all regions, even humid ones and higher-latitude cooler ones, as combining involves no time interval between reaping and threshing, unlike traditional harvesting of cereal grains, which involved shocking (stooking) the grain and allowing it to air dry for weeks in an intermediate step before threshing. As recently as the 1930s, when Cyrus McCormick III wrote his seminal history of the mechanization of grain harvesting (The Century of the Reaper), the mechanical prowess of combine design had already become substantially advanced, but the moisture of the grain still represented a great barrier to extending combining to ubiquity. The general sweep of advancement of mechanized bulk materials handling that occurred in the mid-20th century was of a piece with these other interrelated aspects of novel systems, including greatly advanced trucking, power farming equipment, roadbuilding, electrification, distribution infrastructure for LPG and fuel oil, and so on. All of these factors acting in concert were necessary to make possible the era in which humans produce grain in affordable abundance with extensive mechanization and very little labor per ton.

References 

Grain production